Nigel Warrior (born December 14, 1997) is an American football safety who is a free agent. He played college football at Tennessee.

Early years
Warrior played high school football at Peachtree Ridge High School.

College career
Warrior played at the University of Tennessee from 2016–2019 under head coaches Butch Jones and Jeremy Pruitt. 

In the 2016 season, Warrior appeared in five games and had 22 total tackles. In the 2017 season, Warrior recorded a 70-yard pick-six against Missouri. He appeared in 12 games and had 83 total tackles, one sack, three passes defended, three forced fumbles, and the pick-six. In the 2018 season, he appeared in 12 games and had 64 total tackles and one pass defended. In the 2019 season, he appeared in 12 games and had 60 total tackles, four interceptions, and seven passes defended. He recorded one of his interceptions in the Alabama game. The Crimson Tide were threatening to score in Tennessee territory and Warrior's interception flipped the field.

Professional career

Baltimore Ravens
Warrior was not selected in the 2020 NFL Draft. He signed as an undrafted free agent with the Baltimore Ravens. He was waived after training camp and signed to the practice squad, where he spent his entire rookie season.

On August 31, 2021, Warrior was waived by the Ravens.

Seattle Seahawks
On September 1, 2021, Warrior was claimed by the Seattle Seahawks from waivers. He was placed on injured reserve on September 7, 2021. He was activated on November 27. On April 25, 2022, the Seahawks withdrew Warrior's exclusive rights free agent tender making him an unrestricted free agent.

Personal life
He is the son of Tangie Warrior and his father is former NFL cornerback Dale Carter.

His uncle is former Minnesota Vikings wide receiver Jake Reed, and his first cousin is defensive back J.R. Reed

References

External links

Tennessee Volunteers bio

Living people
1997 births
American football safeties
Baltimore Ravens players
Seattle Seahawks players
Sportspeople from College Park, Georgia
Tennessee Volunteers football players
Players of American football from Georgia (U.S. state)